Isaakio is a village of Evros regional unit in Greece, part of the municipality Didymoteicho. It is located 5 kilometers east of Didymoteicho. Its population according to the 2011 census was 407.

References

External links
buk.gr
MeetGreece.eu

See also
List of settlements in the Evros regional unit

Didymoteicho
Populated places in Evros (regional unit)